The Shropshire Wildlife Trust is a wildlife trust covering the geographic county of Shropshire, England.

Nature reserves
The trust cares for, or is associated with, 42 nature reserves (plus its headquarters in Shrewsbury – see next section) in the county:

Many of these sites are owned by the Trust – the most recent acquisition by the Trust is Catherton Common, in the Clee Hills, which at 527 acres is the largest Wildlife Trust nature reserve in the West Midlands region. The Trust is currently fund-raising to purchase the leasehold of Pontesford Hill – it already owns the freehold, along with neighbouring Earl's Hill. In 2012 the Trust was seeking to purchase the gardens of Charles Darwin's family home at The Mount in Shrewsbury, so that they may be opened to the public.

Headquarters
The Trust has its main offices and visitor centre at 193 Abbey Foregate near the centre of Shrewsbury – they occupy the former "Shrewsbury Quest" museum, on the corner of Abbey Foregate and Old Potts Way, opposite The Abbey church. The site encompasses a restored medieval building known as the Old Infirmary and a 1730s building called Queen Anne House, as well as gardens, including a herb garden established when the site was the Shrewsbury Quest, and a fruit tree garden. The centre and its gardens is open to the public (usually Monday – Saturday) and has a shop as well as conference rooms available for hire. Many Trust-run events take place here, including children's events during the summer holidays. Every year the centre receives approximately 25,000 visitors.

Local branches
The Trust currently has 10 local branches active in the county:

Bridgnorth
Clun and Bishop's Castle
Ellesmere
Ludlow
Market Drayton
Newport
Oswestry
Oswestry Hills Wildlife Watch
Shrewsbury Wildlife Survey Group
Strettons, The
Whitchurch

Additionally, in the Telford area the Trust has helped establish the "Telford and Wrekin Forest" initiative, and has "Wrekin Forest Volunteers".

Specialist groups
The county has a wide range of specialist groups, which are associated with the Shropshire Wildlife Trust, including:

Border Bryologists
Butterfly Conservation West Midlands
Shropshire Amphibian and Reptile Group
Shropshire Badger Group
Shropshire Barn Owl Group
Shropshire Bat Group
Shropshire Botanical Society
Shropshire Fungus Group
Shropshire Invertebrate Group
Shropshire Mammal Group
Shropshire Moth Group
Shropshire Ornithological Society
Shropshire Raven Study Group

Membership
As of 2011 the Shropshire Wildlife Trust's membership is around 11,000 individuals – the figure was just under 6,000 in the year 2000. This equates to roughly 2.2%, or 1 in 50 Shropshire residents. Annual income from subscriptions has risen from £140,000 in 2000 to £250,000 in 2010. In addition to the membership of individuals, there are also corporate memberships, mainly of organisations (almost all private businesses) based in Shropshire, including Müller Dairy (UK), E.ON UK and Harper Adams University.

See also
Royal Society of Wildlife Trusts
List of Conservation topics
Conservation in the United Kingdom

References

External links
Shropshire Wildlife Trust website
Telford and Wrekin Forest initiative

W
W
W
Wildlife Trusts of England
Telford and Wrekin
1964 establishments in England